Lake Grove or Grove Lake may refer to:

 Grove Lake (Clay and Otter Tail counties, Minnesota)
 Grove Lake (Pope County, Minnesota)
 Grove Lake Township, Pope County, Minnesota
 Grove Lake, Minnesota
 Lake Grove Township, Mahnomen County, Minnesota
 Lake Grove, New York
 Lake Grove, Oregon